Sana Torium "Tori" Reid (22 September 1912 – 19 March 2003) was a New Zealand rugby union player. He played 27 matches for the All Blacks including nine internationals. Affiliating to Ngāti Porou, Reid represented New Zealand Māori between 1931 and 1949. In a long first-class career from 1929 to 1952, he played 157 games, which was then a New Zealand record. Between 1952 and 1954, Reid served as a New Zealand Māori selector.

References

External links
 Photograph of Sana Torium Reid. Crown Studios Ltd: negatives and prints. Ref: 1/2-205449-F. Alexander Turnbull Library, Wellington, New Zealand.

1912 births
2003 deaths
Ngāti Porou people
People from Tokomaru Bay
New Zealand rugby union players
New Zealand international rugby union players
East Coast rugby union players
Hawke's Bay rugby union players
Māori All Blacks players
Rugby union locks
Rugby union flankers
Rugby union players from the Gisborne Region